Gaspar Hernández is a small city in Espaillat province on the North Coast Dominican Republic. 

Gaspar Hernandez is a very typical Dominican town, although it is somewhat, indirectly dependent on tourism, its main base of income is cattle and agriculture.

Famous Dominican baseball coach and trainer Ramon Lora (born 1977), now coaching at Western Oklahoma State College, was born in Gaspar Hernandez. Lora's 2011 team captured the NJCAA National Championship while featuring numerous Dominican players at the American college.

History

The current site of Gaspar Hernandez retains features of indigenous culture, mainly of the Ciguayo and Ciboney Indians from the societies of Río San Juan, Nagua and Samana.

The present municipality was founded on April 5, 1907, in a place originally called Canto La Ermita. At that time the population was concentrated on the banks of the river Joba.  The place was renamed Gaspar Hernández in honor of the famous priest, associate of Juan Pablo Duarte in the war of independence from Haiti.

Climate

Economy

The municipality of Gaspar Hernandez has a diversified economy divided between tourism and agricultural production.

Ecotourism exists mainly in the Ojo de Agua district, with caves and caverns, beautiful natural landscapes, and the source of water, dipping between rocks and reappearing as the Ojo de Agua.  Important hotel projects along the coast of Gaspar Hernandez include: Bahia Principe, Bahia Esmeralda, El Pescador, Playa Cana, Playa Rogelio, and Punta Gorda .

The Municipal District of Veragua produces banana, maize, cassava, and sweet potatoes. The District of Joba Arriba is the largest producer of cocoa, with one of the country's largest cocoa farmers' associations. It also produces other minor agricultural products.  Cattle and hogs are another important sector.

Fishing has developed gradually, catering to the tourist resorts of Sosua and Cabarete. Beekeeping is a new activity in the municipality in the production of honey, pollen and Royal Jelly.

References

Sources 
World Gazeteer: Dominican Republic – World-Gazetteer.com
http://www.fallingrain.com/world/DR/8/Gaspar_Hernandez.html
https://web.archive.org/web/20120701190007/http://www.quisqueyavirtual.edu.do/wiki/Municipio_Gaspar_Hern%C3%A1ndez

Municipalities of the Dominican Republic
Populated places in Espaillat Province